Casa Branca or Casabranca (Portuguese for "White House") may refer to:

 Casa Branca, São Paulo
 Casa Branca, Sousel
 Casa Branca do Engenho Velho, a Canbomblé temple in Salvador, Brazil
 Casabranca in Guangdong, China, a former name of Qianshan
 Casabranca in Morocco, a former name of Casablanca

See also
 Casablanca (disambiguation)
 White House (disambiguation)